The Fujifilm FinePix HS20EXR or Fujifilm FinePix HS22EXR is a DSLR-styled digital superzoom bridge camera announced by Fujifilm on January 5, 2011. It is the first model in the Fujifilm FinePix HS line to use an EXR sensor.

References
http://www.dpreview.com/products/fujifilm/compacts/fujifilm_hs20exr/specifications

HS20EXR
Cameras introduced in 2011
Superzoom cameras